Michael "Mick" Edmonds (born 13 November 1966) is a former Australian rules footballer who played for Collingwood in the Victorian Football League (VFL) and Norwood and West Torrens Football Clubs in the South Australian National Football League (SANFL).

Recruited from the Hamilton Imperials in the Western Border Football League (WBFL), Edmonds made two appearances for Collingwood in the 1986 VFL season before heading to South Australia to play for Norwood and West Torrens. Following the end of his playing career, Edmonds returned to coach Hamilton.

Sources
 McNicol, A. "Old rivals' Roo era", The Sunday Age, Sport, p. 12, 7 April 2013.

References

External links

Living people
1966 births
Collingwood Football Club players
Hamilton Imperials Football Club players
Australian rules footballers from Victoria (Australia)